Aquidaba or Aquidabã may refer to:
 Aquidabã, Sergipe, Brazil
 Aquidabã River (disambiguation)
 Brazilian battleship Aquidabã

See also
 Aquidaban (disambiguation)